The Kazan Open is a professional tennis tournament played on outdoor hard courts. The event is part of the ITF Women's Circuit, and in its inaugural year, 2013, the Association of Tennis Professionals (ATP) Challenger Tour.

Past finals

Women's singles

Women's doubles

Men's singles

Men's doubles

References

External links 
  

 
ATP Challenger Tour
ITF Women's World Tennis Tour
Hard court tennis tournaments
Tennis tournaments in Russia
Recurring sporting events established in 2013
Sport in Kazan